Guillaume Cerutti (born March 20, 1966 in La Ciotat, France) is a business executive and former senior civil servant. Since 2017, he is Chief Executive Officer of Christie's.

Career in the private sector
In September 2007, Cerutti joined Sotheby's as CEO of Sotheby's France. In 2011, he was appointed deputy chairman of Sotheby's Europe with responsibilities covering France, Benelux, Monaco, and Italy. He brought the house from fourth-highest sales to first on the French market during his tenure, particularly with the help of several prestigious French art collections sold in Paris, London and New York.

Cerutti left Sotheby's in 2015 to join Christie's as president for EMERI (Europe, Middle East, Russia and India) and became CEO as of January 2017. In the year 2017, he led the company in a rise of 26 percent in total global sales. In addition, the house has held two majorly successful sales under Cerutti's leadership, including the sale of Leonardo da Vinci's Salvator Mundi in November 2017 at Christie's New York with the record-breaking price of $450.3 million and The Collection of Peggy and David Rockefeller in May 2018 which achieved the highest auction total ever for a private collection.

Other responsibilities and achievements
Since 2015, Cerutti has served as Chairman of the Fondation Nationale des Arts Graphiques et Plastiques (FNAGP). In the past, he has also held the position of Chairman on the boards of several non-profit organizations in the cultural field, including the Accentus Chamber Choir (2007-2012), the Ecole Nationale Supérieure de la Photographie in Arles (2009-2010) and the Institute pour le Financement du Cinéma et des Industries Culturelles (2010-2016).

Cerutti is the author of La politique culturelle, un enjeu du XXIème siècle, 20 propositions (éditions Odile Jacob, octobre 2016). He is also the contributor of several articles on cultural politics, notably in the review Commentaire as well as the newspapers Le Monde, Les Échos, and l'Opinion.

References

Living people
1966 births
People from La Ciotat
Sciences Po alumni
École nationale d'administration alumni
Sotheby's people
Christie's people
French chief executives